Flabellina is a genus of sea slugs, specifically aeolid nudibranchs. These animals are marine gastropod molluscs in the family Flabellinidae.

Taxonomic history
The genus Flabellina was established by John Edward Gray in 1833 with the type species Flabellina affinis and characterised by the cerata being arranged on peduncles and the rhinophores being annulate. Many species were added by subsequent authors. In 1981 the genus Coryphella was merged under the older name Flabellina as despite a large range of morphological characters in the 64 species of Flabellinidae and Coryphellidae known at that time, no clear distinction could be found to separate the species into the two genera. In 2017 an integrative study of the 71 species then considered to be included in Flabellina redistributed the species into seven families and 26 genera.

Species
Species currently included in this genus are:

 Flabellina affinis (Gmelin, 1791)
 Flabellina alternata Ortea & Espinosa, 1998
 Flabellina bertschi Gosliner & Kuzirian, 1990
 Flabellina bulbosa Ortea & Espinosa, 1998
 Flabellina dana Millen & Hamann, 2006
 Flabellina dushia (Marcus Ev. & Er., 1963)
 Flabellina engeli Ev. Marcus & Er. Marcus, 1968
 Flabellina engeli lucianae Dacosta, Cunha, Simone & Schrödl, 2007
 Flabellina evelinae Edmunds, 1989
 Flabellina ilidioi Calado, Ortea & Caballer, 2005
 Flabellina llerae Ortea, 1989

 Synonymized species

 Flabellina albomaculata Pola, Carmona, Calado & Cervera, 2014 synonym of Edmundsella albomaculata (Pola, Carmona, Calado & Cervera, 2014)
 Flabellina albomarginata (Miller, 1971) synonym of Coryphellina albomarginata (M. C. Miller, 1971)
 Flabellina alisonae Gosliner, 1980: synonym of Flabellina bicolor
 Flabellina arveloi Ortea & Espinosa, 1998 synonym of Coryphellina arveloi (Ortea & Espinosa, 1998)
 Flabellina athadona (Bergh, 1875) synonym of Occidenthella athadona (Bergh, 1875)
 Flabellina babai Schmekel, 1972 synonym of Luisella babai (Schmekel, 1972)
 Flabellina baetica Garcia-Gomez, 1984 synonym of Baenopsis baetica (Garcia-Gomez, 1984)
 Flabellina bicolor (Kelaart, 1858) synonym of Samla bicolor (Kelaart, 1858)
 Flabellina bilas Gosliner & Willan, 1991 synonym of Samla bilas (Gosliner and Willan, 1991)
 Flabellina californica (Bergh, 1904) synonym of Coryphella californica Bergh, 1904
 Flabellina cerverai Fischer, van der Velde & Roubos, 2007 synonym of Coryphellina cerverai (Fischer, van der Velde & Roubos, 2007)
 Flabellina confusa Gonzalez-Duarte, Cervera & Poddubetskaia, 2008 synonym of Calmella gaditana (Cervera, García-Gomez & García, 1987)
 Flabellina cooperi (Cockerell, 1901) synonym of Orienthella cooperi (Cockerell, 1901)
 Flabellina cynara (Marcus & Marcus, 1967) synonym of Kynaria cynara (Marcus and Marcus, 1967)
 Flabellina delicata Gosliner & Willan, 1991 synonym of Coryphellina delicata (Gosliner & Willan, 1991)
 Flabellina exoptata Gosliner & Willan, 1991 synonym of Coryphellina exoptata (Gosliner & Willan, 1991)
 Flabellina falklandica (Eliot, 1907) synonym of Itaxia falklandica (Eliot, 1907)
 Flabellina funeka Gosliner & Griffiths, 1981 synonym of Paraflabellina funeka (Gosliner & Griffiths, 1981)
 Flabellina fusca (O'Donoghue, 1921): synonym of Flabellina trophina (Bergh, 1890)
 Flabellina goddardi Gosliner, 2010 synonym of Pacifia goddardi (Gosliner, 2010)
 Flabellina hamanni Gosliner, 1994 synonym of Coryphellina hamanni (Gosliner, 1994)
 Flabellina ianthina Angas, 1864: synonym of Pteraeolidia ianthina (Angas, 1864)
 Flabellina inornata A. Costa, 1866: synonym of Spurilla neapolitana Flabellina insolita Garcia-Gomez & Cervera, 1989 synonym of Fjordia insolita (Garcia-Gomez & Cervera, 1989)
 Flabellina iodinea (J. G. Cooper, 1863) synonym of Flabellinopsis iodinea (J. G. Cooper, 1863)
 Flabellina ischitana Hirano & Thompson, 1990 synonym of Paraflabellina ischitana (Hirano & Thompson, 1990)
 Flabellina islandica (Odhner, 1937) synonym of Paracoryphella islandica (Odhner, 1937)
 Flabellina japonica (Volodchenko, 1937) synonym of Ziminella japonica (Volodchenko, 1937)
 Flabellina macassarana Bergh, 1905 synonym of Samla macassarana (Bergh, 1905)
 Flabellina marcusorum Gosliner & Kuzirian, 1990 synonym of Coryphellina marcusorum (Gosliner & Kuzirian, 1990)
 Flabellina newcombi Angas, 1864: synonym of  Facelina newcombi (Angas, 1864)
 Flabellina ornata Angas, 1864: synonym of  Austraeolis ornata (Angas, 1864)
 Flabellina pallida (A. E. Verrill, 1900) synonym of Coryphella pallida A. E. Verrill, 1900
 Flabellina parva (Hadfield, 1963) synonym of Paracoryphella parva (Hadfield, 1963)
 Flabellina pedata (Montagu, 1815) synonym of Edmundsella pedata (Montagu, 1816)
 Flabellina pellucida (Alder & Hancock, 1843) synonym of Carronella pellucida (Alder & Hancock, 1843)
 Flabellina poenicia (Burn, 1957) synonym of Coryphellina poenicia (Burn, 1957)
 Flabellina polaris Volodchenko, 1946 synonym of Polaria polaris (Volodchenko, 1946)
 Flabellina pricei (MacFarland, 1966) synonym of Apata pricei (MacFarland, 1966)
 Flabellina riwo Gosliner & Willan, 1991 synonym of Samla riwo Gosliner & Willan, 1991
 Flabellina rubrolineata (O'Donoghue, 1929) synonym of Coryphellina rubrolineata O'Donoghue, 1929
 Flabellina rubromaxilla Edmunds, 2015  synonym of Paraflabellina rubromaxilla (Edmunds, 2015)
 Flabellina rubropurpurata Gosliner & Willan, 1991 synonym of Samla rubropurpurata (Gosliner and Willan 1991)
 Flabellina salmonacea (Couthouy, 1838) synonym of Ziminella salmonacea (Couthouy, 1838)
 Flabellina scolopendrella Risbec, 1928: synonym of Pteraeolidia ianthina (Angas, 1864)
 Flabellina semperi Bergh, 1870: synonym of Pteraeolidia ianthina (Angas, 1864)
 Flabellina stohleri Bertsch & Ferreira, 1974: synonym of  Flabellina telja Marcus & Marcus, 1967
 Flabellina telja Marcus & Marcus, 1967 synonym of Samla telja (Marcus and Marcus, 1967)
 Flabellina trilineata (O'Donoghue, 1921) synonym of Orienthella trilineata (O'Donoghue, 1921)
 Flabellina trophina (Bergh, 1890) synonym of Himatina trophina (Bergh, 1890)
 Flabellina vansyoci Gosliner, 1994 synonym of Edmundsella vansyoci (Gosliner, 1994)
 Flabellina verrucicornis A. Costa, 1867: synonym of Berghia verrucicornis (A. Costa, 1867)
 Flabellina versicolor Costa A., 1866: synonym of Favorinus branchialis (Rathke, 1806)
 Flabellina verta (Ev. Marcus, 1970) synonym of Coryphella verta Ev. Marcus, 1970

References

 ICZN. (1966). Opinion 781. Flabellina Voigt, 1834 (Gastropoda): Placed on the Official List of Generic Names. Bulletin of Zoological Nomenclature. 23 (2-3): 104-105
 Vaught, K.C. (1989). A classification of the living Mollusca. American Malacologists: Melbourne, FL (USA). . XII, 195 pp
 Petit, R. E. & Coan., E. V. 2008. The molluscan taxa made available in the Griffith & Pidgeon (1833-1834) edition of Cuvier, with notes on the editions of Cuvier and on Wood's Index Testaceologicus''. Malacologia 50: 219-264 page(s): 222

Flabellinidae
Gastropod genera
Taxa named by John Edward Gray